The 2023 Nigerian Senate elections in Osun State will be held on 25 February 2023, to elect the 3 federal Senators from Osun State, one from each of the state's three senatorial districts. The elections will coincide with the 2023 presidential election, as well as other elections to the Senate and elections to the House of Representatives; with state elections being held two weeks later. Primaries were held between 4 April and 9 June 2022.

Background
In the previous Senate elections, none of the three incumbent senators were returned with Olusola Adeyeye (APC-Central) and Babajide Omoworare (APC=East) losing renomination while Ademola Adeleke (PDP-West) retired. In the East district election, Francis Adenigba Fadahunsi gained the seat for the PDP with 50% of the vote while Ajibola Basiru (APC) retained the East district for his party with 54%. In the West district, Adelere Adeyemi Oriolowo (APC) gained the seat with 41% of the vote. The senatorial results were a continuation of slight APC control in the state as the party also won most House of Representatives seats and won a majority in the House of Assembly, in addition to Buhari winning the state in the presidential election.

Overview

Summary

Osun Central 

The Osun Central Senatorial District covers the local government areas of Boluwaduro, Boripe, Ifedayo, Ifelodun, Ila, Irepodun, Odo Otin, Olorunda, Orolu, and Osogbo. Incumbent Ajibola Basiru (APC), who was elected with 54.3% of the vote in 2019, is seeking re-election.

General election

Results

Osun East 

The Osun East Senatorial District covers the local government areas of Atakunmosa East, Atakunmosa West, Ife Central, Ife East, Ife North, Ife South, Ilesa East, Ilesa West, Obokun, and Oriade. Incumbent Francis Adenigba Fadahunsi (APC), who was elected with 50.5% of the vote in 2019, is seeking re-election.

General election

Results

Osun West 

The Osun West Senatorial District covers the local government areas of Aiyedaade, Aiyedire, Ede North, Ede South, Egbedore, Ejigbo, Irewole, Isokan, Iwo, and Ola Oluwa. Incumbent Adelere Adeyemi Oriolowo (APC), who was elected with 41.4% of the vote in 2019, is seeking re-election.

General election

Results

See also 
 2023 Nigerian Senate election
 2023 Nigerian elections
 2023 Osun State elections

References 

Osun State senatorial elections
2023 Osun State elections
Osun State Senate elections